is an EP by Japanese pop band Pizzicato Five, released on April 21, 1999 by Readymade Records.

Track listing

Charts

References

External links
 

1999 EPs
Pizzicato Five EPs
Nippon Columbia albums
Japanese-language EPs